The Lagoon of Narta is a lagoon of the Adriatic Sea on the Mediterranean Sea in the central coast of Albania. The lagoon extends north of the Bay of Vlorë on the eastern shore of the Strait of Otranto and is separated from the sea by a narrow littoral strip, consisting of an alluvial dune.

It is situated within the boundaries of the Vjosa-Narta Protected Landscape and has been recognised as an important Bird and Plant Area of international importance. As of May 2020, it is home to 3,000 flamingos. It is formed by the constant accumulation of solid flow of the Vjosa River, which originates within the Pindus Mountains close to the border between Albania and Greece.

The lagoon is named after the village of Nartë, which is found on the lagoon's southern shores. Within the lagoon, there are two islands located,
with Zvërnec Island being the largest. A wooden footbridge connects mainland to the island, where a 13th-century monastery is located. At least 34,800 wintering birds can be counted on the lagoon.

See also 

 Geography of Albania
 Protected areas of Albania 
 Vjosa-Narta Protected Landscape
 Albanian Adriatic Sea Coast
 Important Bird Areas of Albania

References 

 

Narta
Wetlands of Albania
Geography of Vlorë County
Tourist attractions in Vlorë County
Important Bird Areas of Albania
Albanian Adriatic Sea Coast